John James Colrain (4 February 1937 – 14 July 1984) was a Scottish football player and manager who played for Celtic, Clyde, Ipswich Town and Glentoran. He later managed Glentoran and St Patrick's Athletic.

Colrain played once for the Scotland national under-23 football team at inside-left in a 1–2 defeat to the Netherlands in April 1958.

References

Sources

1937 births
1984 deaths
Footballers from Glasgow
Association football forwards
Ashfield F.C. players
Celtic F.C. players
Clyde F.C. players
Duntocher Hibernian F.C. players
Ipswich Town F.C. players
Glentoran F.C. players
St Patrick's Athletic F.C. players
Glentoran F.C. managers
Manchester City F.C. non-playing staff
Scottish Football League players
Scottish football managers
Scottish footballers
St Patrick's Athletic F.C. managers
Scotland under-23 international footballers
English Football League players
United Soccer Association coaches
United Soccer Association players
Detroit Cougars (soccer) players
Dublin University A.F.C. coaches
Scottish expatriate sportspeople in the United States
Expatriate soccer players in the United States
Scottish expatriate footballers
Expatriate association footballers in the Republic of Ireland
Scottish Junior Football Association players
Scotland junior international footballers
Association football coaches